Marcos Ignacio Velásquez Ahumada (born June 23, 1987) is a Chilean football defender and currently plays for Santiago Wanderers in the Primera B de Chile.

Career
Marcos Velásquez started his career in 2007 in Everton. His first goal was against Coquimbo Unido in a victory over 3-1 in the second half of 2007.

In 2008, Velásquez was crowned champion of the Torneo Apertura 2008 in a 3–0 victory over Colo Colo. After, in 2009 he has not had much participation has played only 5 games all year and 3 of them got to change.

In 2010, he was loaned to Unión San Felipe.

In 2022, he moved to Honduras and joined Vida in the Liga Nacional de Fútbol Profesional. After suffering a violent mugging in his appartment in Honduras, he ended his contract with Vida and returned to Chile to join Santiago Wanderers, the traditional rival of Everton.

Personal life
He is nicknamed Chano for his resemblance to the former footballer Lizardo Chano Garrido.

Honours

Club
Everton
 Primera División de Chile (1): 2008 Apertura
 Primera B de Chile (1): 2011 Clausura

References

External links
 
  BDFA profile
 Velásquez at Football-Lineups

1987 births
Living people
People from Casablanca, Chile
Chilean footballers
Chilean expatriate footballers
Everton de Viña del Mar footballers
Unión San Felipe footballers
Rangers de Talca footballers
C.D.S. Vida players
Santiago Wanderers footballers
Chilean Primera División players
Primera B de Chile players
Liga Nacional de Fútbol Profesional de Honduras players
Expatriate footballers in Honduras
Chilean expatriate sportspeople in Honduras
Association football defenders